Michael George Corcoran (born January 25, 1963) is an American politician who served in the Missouri House of Representatives from the 77th district from 2003 to 2011.

Michael G Corcoran was elected Mayor of St. Ann, Missouri in 2019

References

1963 births
Living people
Democratic Party members of the Missouri House of Representatives